Leninsky is a rural locality (a selo) in Rassvetovsky Selsoviet, Davlekanovsky District, Bashkortostan, Russia. The population was 358 as of 2010. There are 6 streets.

Geography 
Leninsky is located 28 km northwest of Davlekanovo (the district's administrative centre) by road. Ivanovka is the nearest rural locality.

References 

Rural localities in Davlekanovsky District